Filippo Scòzzari (Bologna, 1946), is an Italian comics artist, painter and writer, one of the main figures of  the 1970s underground art movement.  Known for his first comic at Mondadori's Il Mago under the pen name Winslow Leech, he worked for Re Nudo and Il Mago, Radio Alice of Bologna, Cannibale, Il Male, Frigidaire, Blue, Panorama, TV Sorrisi e Canzoni and Glamour International.

Career
His career began in the 1970s, appearing in various underground satirical publications; in 1979  he collaborated with the satirical  weekly publication Il Male, and in the subsequent years he was published in Fri'Zzer, Tempi Supplementari, Il Lunedì della Repubblica and was among the founders of the comic magazines Cannibale and Frigidaire.

During the same years he also appeared in Re Nudo, Linus, Vogue, Spaceships Today, Panorama, and Alteralter.

His comics have been published in France, Brazil and Greece.

Most of his comics has been collected in eight books published in Italy by Primo Carnera Editore and Coniglio Editore, in France by Albin Michel, in Brazil by Conrad Editora.

He wrote six novels, an anthology of his best New P-Porno tales and a theatrical work, Heart in Slices. He held several exhibitions in Italy: in Rimini, in Montecchio Emilia, in Rome, in Reggio Emilia, in Milan, in Turin, in Bologna and, abroad, in Athens.

Among his comic books are: a graphic novel based on Raymond Chandler's screenplay The Blue Dahlia (La Dalia Azzurra, 1981),  a collection of stories from his underground period (Doctor Jack, 1982), a collection of his early science fiction short stories (Mud and Oxygen, 1992) and various collections of the comics formerly published in FRIGIDAIRE magazine (Women, 1987, Sister Big Tooth & others Battles, 1992).

Very interesting his last sci-fi cartoons anthology "LASSU' NO" (UP THERE, NO): "Thousands of details, of flesh and bolts, and then male, clerks, yawns, shady landings and ruthless assassins. Dirty worlds, mud balls, opalescent palaces like extra-luxury rocket hoods. Crazy colors, off the spectrum of bourgeois decency. All this and much more are the comics of Filippo Scòzzari, if you look at them, but if you had to risk reading them you would be invaded like the Earth by aliens. The language of Flip La Folì (one of the many adorable pseudonyms) is the most untold and unmatched in the world comic, intricate literary construction but plausible spoken of its irregular protagonists, often equated to the prose of Thomas Landolfi for the pleasure and freedom of invention and for the sadistic mastery of stress the syntax until it is incandescent, steaming, one step away from the disintegration of the gears. Scòzzariano is said when someone tries to play hard with words and their sequence, scòzzarian is who, like me, finds himself delivered a narrative Ferrari accustomed as it was to read only utilitarians, at the maximum of Citroen. This book is the account of a climb, a book-binoculars that makes us enjoy one of the most daring comic shows ever, a peak unattainable by nature, by magic, by choice. The world is full of summits to aim for, where your sherpa can lead you. Equipped with everything, you can go anywhere. But where Scòzzari went, no, not up there." (Ratigher)

A key figure in the underground milieu of Bologna and Rome in the 1970s and 1980s, Filippo Scòzzari is one of the most influent master of Italian comics. A painter, a writer, a graphic artist and an illustrator, Scòzzari participated to the fundamental experiences of Italian alternative culture, active between magazines, radio stations, and artistic centers. Among them, "Re nudo", "Il Male", "Radio Alice", "Cannibale", "Traumfabrik", "Alter Alter", and "Frigidaire". With the Roman groups "Cannibale" and "Frigidaire", Scòzzari operated critically in the Italian comics culture, exploring possibilities that had never been investigated before, and expanding the use of comics in an artistic direction, as a tool for socio-political investigation. He contributed to disseminate a new aesthetic awareness around the medium of comics. His distinctive comics technique involves a constant clash between the fineness of the drawing and the color, and the contents, intentionally caricatural, grotesque, and anti-idealistic, provoking an effect of unveiling of the mechanisms behind this medium, and an irreverent anti-bourgeois polemic. Examples of this tendency are "Suor Dentona", "Dottor Jack", "Primo Carnera", as well as the comics adaptations of Tommaso Landolfi's "Mar delle Blatte", and "The Blue Dahlia" by Raymond Chandler. Among his writings, his autobiographical memorial "Prima pagare poi ricordare", and the play "Cuore di Edmondo", inspired by Edmondo de Amicis' novel "Cuore". His science fiction comics have been recently collected in "Lassù no" by Coconino press (2019), which published in 2020 the graphic novel edition of "Il mar delle blatte".
(Carlotta Vacchelli)

Works
 Primo Carnera, cartoons, Roma, Primo Carnera Editore, 1982
 La dalia azzurra, cartoons, Roma, Primo Carnera Editore, 1982 [Ristampa Coniglio Editore 2006 e Editoriale Cosmo 2017]
 Dottor Jack, cartoons, Roma, Primo Carnera Editore, 1983
 Donne (odori, nei, peli e altri fantasmi), cartoons, Roma, Primo Carnera Editore, 1985
 Suor Dentona (e altre battaglie), cartoons, Roma, Primo Carnera Editore, 1988 [Integral edition Mompracem, 2012]
 Fango e ossigeno, cartoons, Roma, Primo Carnera Editore, 1988
 Altri cieli, Roma, sci-fi cartoons, Primo Carnera Editore, 1992
 Cuore di Edmondo, theatrical text, Bologna, Granata Press, 1993 
 XXXX! Racconti porni, anthology of stories, Roma, Castelvecchi, 1996 Coniglio Editore, 2008. 
 Prima pagare poi ricordare. Da «Cannibale» a «Frigidaire». Storia di un manipolo di ragazzi geniali, diary, Roma, Castelvecchi, 1997 [Ristampa Coniglio Editore, 2004, ]
 Figate, illustrations, Mare nero, 1999. 
 L'Isterico a Metano, novel, Milano, Mondadori, 1999. 
 Memorie dell'arte bimba, diary, Roma, Coniglio Editore, 2008. 
 Proverbi afghani, anthology of illustrated proverbs, Genova, Grrrzetic, 2009. 
 Filippo Scòzzari e l'Insonnia Occidentale, anthology of stories, Roma, Coniglio Editore, 2011. 
 Prima pagare poi ricordare. Fanciulli pazzi. Tutta La Storia, diary, Roma, Fandango Libri, 2017. 
 Lassù no, sci-fi cartoons, postfaction by Daniele Mari, Roma, Fandango Libri, 2019.

References

External links
 
 
 

1946 births
Living people
Italian comics artists
Italian comics writers
20th-century Italian novelists
20th-century Italian male writers
Italian magazine founders